The College for Higher Tibetan Studies, Sarah (CHTS, Sarah) (Tibetan བོད་ཀྱི་མཐོ་རིམ་སློབ་གཉེར་ཁང་, Wylie: bod kyi mtho rim slob gnyar khang) is an advanced Tibetan studies college founded in 1991 by the late Gen Lobsang Gyatso la under the guidance of and with funding provided by the 14th Dalai Lama. The College is a branch of Institute of Buddhist Dialectics (IBD) based in McLeod Ganj, Dharamshala, India.

References

External links
  Official website of CHTS, Sarah

Education in Dharamshala